Bonventre is an Italian surname. Notable people with the surname include:

Cesare Bonventre (1951–1984), Italian mobster
Daniel Bonventre (born ), American money manager
Giovanni Bonventre (1901 – 1970s?), American mobster
Vincent Martin Bonventre (born 1948), American law professor
Vito Bonventre (1875–1930), American mobster

References

Surnames of Italian origin